William Hamish Beith Wallace  (born 25 October 1956) is a consultant Paediatric Oncologist at the Royal Hospital for Sick Children, Edinburgh. Since 2015, Wallace has been National Clinical Director of the Managed Service Network for Children and Young People with Cancer in Scotland.

Life
Hamish Wallace was born in Edinburgh to William Wallace and Joan née Beith Wallace.  Wallace attended firstly Gillsland Park School until the age of 11, followed by Oundle School in Northamptonshire, later graduating from St George's, University of London, University of London, in 1980. Wallace undertook his clinical training in paediatric oncology at Great Ormond Street Hospital, the University of Birmingham Medical School and the Royal Hospital for Sick Children, Edinburgh. Wallace was awarded a Leukaemia Research Fund Research Fellowship with his consultant being Stephen Shalet at the University of Manchester and the Royal Manchester Children's Hospital, in the late 1980s. It was during this period, that he developed an interest in the late endocrine effects of the treatment of childhood cancer.

In 2004, Hamish married Elizabeth Wotherspoon. They have three children, and currently reside in North Berwick. Wallace has three children. Callum (24 October 1982, Kirsty (01, March 1984) and Duncan (6 June 1986).

Papers

Wallace has published many papers regarding cancer and fertility treatment. Here is a selection of some his most important ones.

1. Fertility preservation for young patients with cancer: who is at risk and what can be offered? 

2. The radiosensitivity of the human oocyte 

3. Predicting age of ovarian failure after radiation to a field that includes the ovaries 

4. American Society of Clinical Oncology recommendations on fertility preservation in cancer patients 

5. The physiology and clinical utility of anti-Müllerian hormone in women

Clinical Networks

He is the chair and founder of the Paediatric Neuro-Oncology Group for children with brain tumours from the South-east of Scotland. Members of the group include neurologists, neurosurgeons, clinical oncologists, radiologists, neuropathologists from Edinburgh and Tayside.

He is also the chair of the Scottish Paediatric Haematology Oncology Group  to form a managed clinical network  meeting six times a year for case discussion, audit and research (he was the elected chair from 1998-2006).

Other positions include: member and co-founder Edinburgh Sarcoma Group , Member and center coordinator of the United Kingdom Children's Cancer Study (UKCCS)  and Chair of the UKCCSG Chemotherapy Standardisation Committee (1993-1998).

References

1956 births
Living people